Rodney A.M. Dale (28 November 1933 – 29 March 2020) was an English author, editor, publisher, and a co-founder and former member of Cambridge Consultants Ltd.  He wrote principally on non-fiction topics (biography, technology, computing, jazz, illustration, and folklore), as well as three novels, a number of poems, and pantomimes.

Early life 

Dale was born in Muswell Hill (North London) to Donald and Celia Dale in 1933.  In 1939, with the approach of war, the family left London for Cambridge, where Dale was to develop lifelong interests in writing, engineering, printing, publishing, and music.  He attended The Perse School from 1940 to 1952.  In 1953 Dale began a two-year term of National Service, first joining the Suffolk Regiment and later transferring to the Royal Army Education Corps, where he served as a sergeant instructor both in Shorncliffe, Kent, and Münster, Westphalia (BAOR12), Germany.  Having earlier (1950) been awarded a scholarship to the University of Cambridge, he matriculated at Queens' College, Cambridge in 1955 and studied natural sciences.  In 1959 he established Polyhedron Services, a design and print company, which he developed for four years.

Cambridge Consultants 

It was at the University of Cambridge that Dale had met Tim Eiloart and David Southward, then fellow students and with whom he would later establish Cambridge Consultants Ltd., the first independent research and development organisation in the United Kingdom.  In 1963 he joined Cambridge Consultants full-time, heading several design projects before ultimately assuming the role of the organisation's personnel and training manager. His 1979 book From Ram Yard to Milton Hilton (updated in 1981 to mark the move of the company from Bar Hill to the Cambridge Science Park) chronicles the organisation's background, founding, and first two decades; his 2010 revision, From Ram Yard to Milton Hilton: Cambridge Consultants – The Early Years, was published upon the 50th anniversary of the establishment of Cambridge Consultants.

Writing and publishing 

In parallel with his work at Cambridge Consultants, Dale developed his career as an author, writing a series of articles on new technology for The Engineer as well as the first biography of artist–illustrator Louis Wain.  Louis Wain: The Man Who Drew Cats (1968; republished in 1991 and 2000) renewed national interest in Wain and led to an exhibition of his works, which Dale helped to organise, at the Victoria & Albert Museum (London) in December 1972.

In 1976 Dale left Cambridge Consultants to become a full-time writer, both of books and commercial literature.  Among books written during this period were The Manna Machine (1978) and The Kaballah Decoded (1978), both co-authored with the multitalented linguist George Sassoon.  He also wrote The World of Jazz (1980) and The Sinclair Story (1985), a biography of the entrepreneur Sir Clive Sinclair.

In the mid-1970s Dale began collecting apocryphal anecdotes, which at the time were sometimes termed "whale-tumour stories," now more commonly known as contemporary or urban legends.  This resulted in publication of The Tumour in the Whale: A Collection of Modern Myths (1978), the first popular compilation of and commentary on contemporary or urban legends and which American folklorist Jan Brunvand has described as "a landmark work."  In 1976 Dale coined the word "foaf" (for "friend of a friend") to describe apocryphal narratives involving someone at some distance from the teller.  He used this word in The Tumour in the Whale to signify that an anecdote in question "has been reported from several quarters, that its provenance is shady, [and] that it is almost certainly a whale-tumour story."  As the International Society for Contemporary Legend Research (ISCLR) has since noted, "Dale pointed out that contemporary legends always seemed to be about someone just two or three steps from the teller – a boyfriend's cousin, a co-worker's aunt, or a neighbor of the teller's mechanic"; in recognition of this concept, the ISCLR in 1985 named its quarterly newsletter FoafTale News.  Brunvand holds that "international students of urban legends have accepted FOAF with enthusiasm as a shorthand reference to the claimed source of stories."  "Foaf" was added to the Oxford English Dictionary in 2009.  Dale continued his work on contemporary legends with the publications of It's True ... It Happened to a Friend: A Collection of Urban Legends (1984) and The Wordsworth Book of Urban Legend: Tall Tales for Our Times (2005).

With colleagues, Dale in 1984 created Business Literature Services Ltd. (now known as Flag Communication Ltd.), a publishing house devoted to business-related writing, and singlehandedly established Fern House Publishing in 1990.  In addition, between 1992 and 1994 Dale served as series editor and writer for eight Discoveries & Inventions books for the British Library.  He also wrote three novels:  About Time (1995), The Secret World of Zoë Golding (2010), and The New Life of Hannah Brooks (2013). He also from time to time performed a one-man show called "Hello, Mrs Fish."

Community service 
Dale served as a trustee of the non-profit Centre for Computing History in Cambridge. He was also a long-serving trustee of the Cambridgeshire Farmland Museum, now to be found on the A10 at Waterbeach, which shares a site with the ancient monument, Denny Abbey. Dale played a crucial part in organising the Museum's move from its original site in Haddenham, Cambridgeshire, to its present location.  He was a Magistrate on the Cambridge City Bench from 1977 to 1984 and was a past member of both Bar Hill and Haddenham Parish Councils.

Published works

 Louis Wain – The Man Who Drew Cats, 1968 (William Kimber) 
 Bridges, 1973 (Colourmaster Junior Series) 
 Inland Waterways, 1974 (Colourmaster Junior Series) 
 Iron Roads, 1974 (Colourmaster Junior Series)
 Catland, 1977 (Duckworth)
 The Kabbalah Decoded, 1978 (With George Sassoon; Duckworth)
 The Manna Machine, 1978 (With George Sassoon; Sidgwick & Jackson)
 The Tumour in the Whale: A Collection of Modern Myths, 1978 (Duckworth, W.H. Allen)
 BASIC Programming, 1979 (With Ian Williamson & Tim Eiloart; Cambridge Learning Enterprises)
 Die Manna Maschine, 1979 (With George Sassoon, a German translation of The Manna Machine; Moewig Verlag)
 Edwardian Inventions 1901–1905, 1979 (With Joan Gray; W.H. Allen)
 From Ram Yard to Milton Hilton, 1979 (Cambridge Consultants Ltd.)
 Hobsons Engineering Casebook, 1979 (editor; Hobsons)
 Hobsons Computing Casebook, 1980 (editor; Hobsons)
 The Manna Machine, 1980 (With George Sassoon; Panther)
 The Myth of the Micro, 1980 (With Ian Williamson; Star)
 The World of Jazz, 1980 (Phaidon)
 Understanding Microprocessors with the Science of Cambridge MK-14, 1980 (With Ian Williamson; Macmillan)
 From Ram Yard to Milton Hilton: A History of Cambridge Consultants, 1982 (Cambridge Consultants Ltd.)
 A Career in Architecture, 1983 (With Julian Marsh; RIBA)
 A History of Jazz, 1983 (Jade Books)
 It's True ... It Happened to a Friend, 1984 (Duckworth)
 Der är sant ... en god vän berättade, 1985 (A Swedish translation of It's True ... It Happened to a Friend; Mimer)
 Hobsons 6th Form Casebook, 1985 (editor; Hobsons)
 The Sinclair Story, 1985 (Duckworth)
 Walter Wilson – Portrait of an Inventor, 1986 (SCG, Duckworth)
 Understanding AIDS, 1988 (With John Starkie; Hodder & Stoughton)
 Louis Wain – The Man Who Drew Cats, 1991 (Chris Beetles & Michael O'Mara)
 Machines in the Home, 1992 (With Rebecca Weaver; The British Library) 
 The Industrial Revolution, 1992 (With Henry Dale; The British Library)
 Timekeeping, 1992 (The British Library) 
 Early Cars, 1994 (The British Library)
 Early Railways, 1994 (The British Library)
 Home Entertainment, 1994 (With Rebecca Weaver; The British Library)
 Machines in the Office, 1994 (With Rebecca Weaver; The British Library)
 About Time, 1995 (Fern House Publishing)
 The Fern House Design & Technology Pack, 1995 (With Cyndy Fiddy; Fern House Publishing)
 Catland, 1995 (The Promotional Reprint Company)
 Maszyna do produkcji manny, 1996 (With George Sassoon; Amber)
 A Dictionary of Abbreviations & Acronyms, 1997, 1999, 2001 (With Steve Puttick; Wordsworth Editions)
 Cats in Books – A Celebration of Cat Illustrations through the Ages, 1997 (The British Library, Abrams)
 Teach Yourself Jazz, 1997, 2004 (Hodder Educational)
 Cats in Books, 1998 (Nakano Museum Books Ltd, Japan)
 Halcyon Days – Recollections of Post-War Vintage Motoring, 1999 (Fern House Publishing)
 The Wordsworth Dictionary of Culinary and Menu Terms, 2000 (Wordsworth Editions)
 Haddenham & Aldreth Past and Present, 2000 (Fern House Publishing)
 Puss in Boots, 2001 (Fern House Publishing)
 A Treasury of Essential Proverbs, 2003 (BookBlocks – CRW Publishing)
 A Treasury of Love Poems, 2003 (BookBlocks – CRW Publishing)
 The Book of WHAT?, 2004 (CRW Publishing)
 The Book of WHEN?, 2004 (CRW Publishing)
 The Book of WHERE?, 2004 (CRW Publishing)
 The Book of WHO?, 2004 (CRW Publishing)
 The Wordworth Book of Urban Legend, 2005 (Wordsworth Editions)
 Dickens Dictionary, 2006 (Wordsworth Editions)
 Sayings Usual & Unusual, 2007 (Wordsworth Reference Series)
 Cats in Books, 2008 (British Library Publications)
 From Ram Yard to Milton Hilton: Cambridge Consultants – The Early Years, 2010 (Fern House Publishing)
 The Secret World of Zoë Golding, 2010 (Pen name, Jane MacGowan; Fern House Publishing)
 The New Life of Hannah Brooks, 2013 (Fern House Publishing)
 Get Started in Jazz, 2014 (Teach Yourself)

References

External links
Rodney Dale talks about the earliest days of Cambridge Consultants, via the Centre for Computing History (2016).
Rodney Dale performs a segment from "Hello, Mrs. Fish," his one-man show (2008).

English science writers
English non-fiction writers
People educated at The Perse School
Alumni of Queens' College, Cambridge
Living people
1933 births
English male non-fiction writers
Military personnel from London
Suffolk Regiment soldiers